The Flanagan Boy (released in the United States as Bad Blonde) is a 1953 British film noir directed by Reginald Le Borg. It was made by Hammer Film Productions and stars Barbara Payton, Tony Wright, Frederick Valk and Sid James. The Flanagan Boy was based on the 1949 novel of the same name by Max Catto.

Plot
A shady promoter (James) spots a young boxer (Wright) and takes him under his wing, in an attempt to launch a comeback into prizefighting. He secures the backing of a wealthy Italian (Valk), but problems start to arise when the fighter becomes romantically involved with the millionaire's wife (Payton).

Cast

 Barbara Payton as Lorna Vecchi
 Frederick Valk as Giuseppe Vecchi
 John Slater as Charlie Sullivan
 Sid James as Sharkey
 Tony Wright as Johnny Flanagan
 Marie Burke as Mother Vecchi
 Selma Vaz Dias as Mrs. Corelli, Vecchi's sister
 Enzo Coticchia as Mr. Corelli

References

External links
 
 

1953 films
1953 crime drama films
Adultery in films
British black-and-white films
British crime drama films
Films based on British novels
Films directed by Reginald Le Borg
Film noir
Films shot in Berkshire
Hammer Film Productions films
Lippert Pictures films
1950s English-language films
1950s British films